Africa is an unincorporated community in Ohio Township, Spencer County, in the U.S. state of Indiana.

It is located south of the town of Rockport.

Geography

References

Unincorporated communities in Spencer County, Indiana
Unincorporated communities in Indiana